At least two ships of the French Navy have been named Alcide:

  a 64-gun ship of the line launched in 1743 and captured by the Royal Navy in 1755
  a 74-gun  launched in 1782 and lost in 1795

French Navy ship names